Len Aiyappa (born 31 March 1979) is an Indian professional field hockey player. He remained one of India's best drag-flickers until he retired from the national team following a fallout with the Indian Hockey Federation in 2006. He last played for India during the Sultan Azlan Shah Cup in 2005.

Career
Aiyappa, playing for Karnataka Lions in the inaugural season of the World Series Hockey, became the top scorer for the team and third overall by scoring 13 goals in 12 games.
He joined the team on the insistence of Dhanraj Pillay and the coach of Karnataka Lions, Jude Felix and scored a hat-trick in the game against Chandigarh Comets.

Personal life
He is married.

References

1979 births
Living people
Kodava people
People from Kodagu district
Field hockey players from Karnataka
World Series Hockey players
Indian male field hockey players